The Man'yōshū is an anthology of Japanese waka poetry. It was compiled in the eighth century (during Japan's Nara period), likely in a number of stages by several people, with the final touches likely being made by Ōtomo no Yakamochi, the poet whose work is most prominently featured in the anthology. The Man'yōshū is the oldest anthology of poetry in classical Japanese, as well as the largest, with over 4,500 poems included, and is widely regarded as the finest. The collection is distinguished from later anthologies of classical Japanese poetry not only by its size but by its variety of poetic forms, as it includes not only the 5-7-5-7-7 tanka form, which by the time of the Kokin Wakashū had become ubiquitous, but also the longer chōka form (which included an indefinite number of 5-7 verses and ended with 5-7-7), the 5-7-7-5-7-7 sedōka and the 5-7-5-7-7-7 bussokusekika. The poets also came from a wide variety of social classes, from members of the imperial family and courtiers to frontier guards and commoners in the eastern provinces (ja), while later anthologies would be limited to works composed by those of the upper classes.

The vast majority of the poems of the Man'yōshū were composed over a period of roughly a century, with scholars dividing them into four "periods". Princess Nukata's poetry is included in that of the first period (645–672), while the second period (673–701) is represented by the poetry of Kakinomoto no Hitomaro, generally regarded as the greatest of Man'yōshū poets and one of the most important poets in Japanese history. The third period (702–729) includes the poems of Takechi no Kurohito, whom Donald Keene called "[t]he only new poet of importance" of the early part of this period, when Fujiwara no Fuhito promoted the composition of kanshi (poetry in classical Chinese). Other "third period" poets include: Yamabe no Akahito, a poet who was once paired with Hitomaro but whose reputation has suffered in modern times; Takahashi no Mushimaro, one of the last great chōka poets, who recorded a number of Japanese legends such as that of Ura no Shimako; and Kasa no Kanamura, a high-ranking courtier who also composed chōka but not as well as Hitomaro or Mushimaro. But the most prominent and important poets of the third period were Ōtomo no Tabito, Yakamochi's father and the head of a poetic circle in the Dazaifu, and Tabito's friend Yamanoue no Okura, possibly an immigrant from the Korean kingdom of Paekche, whose poetry is highly idiosyncratic in both its language and subject matter and has been highly praised in modern times. Yakamochi himself was a poet of the fourth period (730–759), and according to Keene he "dominated" this period. He composed the last dated poem of the anthology in 759.

Numbers given in the following list are those used in the Kokka Taikan (KKTK). The Japanese text follows Susumu Nakanishi's Man'yōshū Jiten and includes the poets' kabane where applicable, with italic romanizations included where the Japanese text differs from the proper names at the start of each entry. Italicized numbers indicate traditional attribution given as such in the Man'yōshū itself. (Man'yōshū poems that were attributed to these poets by later works are not listed.) "Poet" names in parentheses indicate that the name is not that of a human poet but that of an earlier collection from which the Man'yōshū took the poems; such works are listed separately, immediately below the entry on the poet with whom they are associated, following Nakanishi. Square brackets indicate poems' numbers according to the Kan'ei-bon text of the Man'yōshū, rather than the KKTK. "Anonymous" poems such as those attributed to "a man" or "a girl" are included when Nakanishi lists them under those "names".

List

Notes

References

Citations

Works cited 

 
 
 
 
 
 
 
 
 
 
 
 
 
 
 

Lists of poets
Man'yō poets